Sfortia Ponzoni (born in 1582 in Venice) was an Italian clergyman and bishop for the Roman Catholic Archdiocese of Split-Makarska. He was appointed bishop in 1616. He died in 1640.

References 

1582 births
1640 deaths
Italian Roman Catholic bishops
Bishops of Split